Centerville (also known as Alma) is an unincorporated community in Tyler County, West Virginia, United States. Centerville has a post office with ZIP code 26320; the post office uses the name Alma.

References

Unincorporated communities in Tyler County, West Virginia
Unincorporated communities in West Virginia